30-42 Lower Fort Street, Millers Point are heritage-listed terrace houses located at 30-42 Lower Fort Street, in the inner city Sydney suburb of Millers Point in the City of Sydney local government area of New South Wales, Australia. It was designed by the NSW Government Architect. The property was added to the New South Wales State Heritage Register on 2 April 1999.

History 
Millers Point is one of the earliest areas of European settlement in Australia, and a focus for maritime activities. This block of apartments is one of a group built as part of the post-bubonic plague redevelopment of the area. First tenanted by the NSW Department of Housing in 1982.

Description 
Block of three-storey face brick  apartments with restrained detailing. Contains three two-bedroom units and three one-bedroom units. Storeys: Three; Construction: Face brick, corrugated iron roof and timber bracketed sun hoods. Cast iron balconies. Painted timber windows. Style: Federation Arts and Crafts.

The external condition of the property is good.

Modifications and dates 
External: Shutters altered. Joinery modified.

Heritage listing 
As at 23 November 2000, this block is a group of three storey apartment blocks built  which is a fine example of post-plague workers' housing.

It is part of the Millers Point Conservation Area, an intact residential and maritime precinct. It contains residential buildings and civic spaces dating from the 1830s and is an important example of 19th century adaptation of the landscape.

30-42 Lower Fort Street, Millers Point was listed on the New South Wales State Heritage Register on 2 April 1999.

See also 

Australian residential architectural styles
28 Lower Fort Street
2-4 Trinity Avenue

References

Bibliography

Attribution

External links

 
 

New South Wales State Heritage Register sites located in Millers Point
Federation style architecture
Terraced houses in Sydney
Articles incorporating text from the New South Wales State Heritage Register
1910 establishments in Australia
Houses completed in 1910
Arts and Crafts architecture in Australia
Millers Point Conservation Area